Luisa Marvelia Ortega Díaz (born 11 January 1958) is a Venezuelan lawyer. Between December 2007 and August 2017, she served as the Prosecutor General of Venezuela. A proponent of the Chavismo ideology, Ortega Díaz was fired as Prosecutor General on 5 August 2017 by the Supreme Tribunal of Justice and the Constituent National Assembly (ANC) promoted by Nicolás Maduro, following a breaking with the Maduro government as a result of the 2017 Venezuelan constitutional crisis in the context of the crisis in Venezuela. This dismissal was rejected by the opposition-led National Assembly of Venezuela, arguing that only that institution had the power to carry out said removal according to the Constitution, and cataloging the Prosecutor as the only legitimate authority of the Public Ministry. As a result, she is called by the National Assembly, the Supreme Tribunal of Justice of Venezuela in exile and some media outlets as the Prosecutor General of Venezuela in exile.

Early life and career
Ortega Díaz was born in Valle de la Pascua, in Guárico State, on 11 January 1958.

She was educated at the University of Carabobo, in Carabobo, graduating in law. She then chose to specialize in criminal law and in procedural law and moved to Caracas. She studied criminal law at the Universidad Santa María and procedural law at Andrés Bello Catholic University, both in the capital.

Ortega later became a law professor at the Universidad Santa María and still holds the title. She also served as a legal consultant to the state TV channel, Venezolana de Televisión.

Prosecutor General
In April 2002, Ortega joined the public prosecution service, in the Ministerio Público.

She was Prosecutor General under Nicolás Maduro when arrest warrants and indictments were issued against opposition leader Leopoldo López. After her dismissal as Prosecutor General, Ortega stated that she was pressured to bring about trumped up charges against López.

Ortega denounced the rupture of democracy in Venezuela when the Venezuelan Supreme Court, in a move broadly, both nationally and internationally, considered a power grab, assumed powers constitutionally attributed to the National Assembly. The move was seen as a betrayal by the Maduro government and resulted in subsequent accusations by the Maduro government and the Venezuelan Supreme Court.

On 29 June 2017, the Supreme Court barred her from leaving the country and froze her assets, due to alleged "serious misconduct" in office.

She was dismissed as Prosecutor General by the newly established National Constituent Assembly on 5 August 2017.

Later life
Tarek William Saab, the replacement Prosecutor General appointed by the Constituent Assembly, stated on 16 August 2017 that Ortega and her husband, German Ferrer, operated an extortion group. The Constituent Assembly ordered their arrest the next day and the couple fled to Colombia. Ferrer said the charges were political in nature.

Ortega and Ferrer fled from Venezuela by speedboat to Aruba and then flew into Colombia. Ortega stated that the Maduro government would "deprive me of my life".

In late August 2017, Maduro said he was seeking an international arrest warrant for both Ortega and her husband because they had been involved in serious crimes.

See also

Government of Venezuela

References

External links
 

1958 births
Living people
People from Valle de la Pascua
Venezuelan women lawyers
21st-century Venezuelan women politicians
21st-century Venezuelan politicians
Universidad Santa María (Venezuela) alumni
Venezuelan defectors
Venezuelan feminists
People of the Crisis in Venezuela